Ballipadu is a village in West Godavari district in the state of Andhra Pradesh in India. Bhimavaram is the nearest town approximately 15 km away.

Demographics
 India census, Ballipadu has a population of 4116 of which 2091 are males while 2025 are females. The average sex ratio of Ballipadu village is 968. The child population is 384, which makes up 9.33% of the total population of the village, with sex ratio 1010, significantly higher than state average. In 2011, the literacy rate of Ballipadu village was 73.29% when compared to 67.02% of Andhra Pradesh.

Administration
As per Panchyati Raaj Act, Ballipadu is governed by sarpanch or village head.

See also 
 West Godavari district

References 

Villages in West Godavari district